Right Hand may refer to:

"Right Hand" (song), by Drake, 2015
"Right Hand", a 2007 song by T-Pain from Epiphany
The Right Hand (TV series), a Canadian reality show

See also
Handedness
Right Hand Man (disambiguation)